Melanie Ann Levesque (born May 20, 1957) is an American politician from the state of New Hampshire. A Democrat, Levesque represented the 12th district in the New Hampshire Senate from 2018 until 2020; she was the first African American to serve in that body. Levesque was chair of the Senate Election Law & Municipal Affairs committee, and served on the Judiciary and Transportation committees. Levesque previously served in the New Hampshire House of Representatives from 2006 to 2010 and 2012 to 2014. In 2021, Levesque was a senior advisor for the New Hampshire Democratic Party. In 2022, Levesque announced her run for the New Hampshire Secretary of State.

Education and career
Levesque was born in the Boston neighborhood of Roxbury. She earned an A.A. from New Hampshire Vocational-Technical College, a B.S. from Daniel Webster College, and an M.B.A. from Southern New Hampshire University. She is the president of TCS of America Enterprises LLC, a telecommunications service provider based in Brookline.

New Hampshire House of Representatives
Levesque was elected to the New Hampshire House of Representatives in 2006 for Hillsborough's 5th district, a four-member district. She served two terms before being defeated for re-election in 2010. Levesque was Assistant Majority Floor Leader between 2008 and 2010.

She served on both the House Election Law and the Science Technology and Energy committees, where she earned a reputation for working across political lines in order to enact legislation that improved the lives of the families she represented. In 2009 Levesque Sponsored and passed a bill to create a  Statewide Emergency Notification System for NH.

In 2012, Levesque successfully ran for Hillsborough's 26th district, serving once again as Assistant Majority Floor Leader before being defeated for a second term in 2014. She ran and lost once again for the same district in 2016.

New Hampshire Senate
In 2018, Levesque announced she would run for the 12th district in the New Hampshire Senate against Republican incumbent Kevin Avard. After defeating Tom Falter in the primary election, Levesque defeated Avard in the general election 50.3% to 49.7%, a margin of 169 votes. Levesque's victory was one of five seats Democrats flipped to regain the majority in the Senate.

Levesque was the Senate's first African American member. She was chair of the Election Law and Municipal Affairs Committee, and a member of the Judiciary Committee and the Transportation Committee.

In 2020, Levesque was defeated by Kevin Avard in a rematch of their 2018 contest. Levesque was defeated again by Kevin Avard in 2022

Personal life
Levesque lives in Brookline, New Hampshire with her husband Scott, with whom she has one child.

References

External links

1957 births
20th-century African-American people
20th-century African-American women
21st-century African-American politicians
21st-century African-American women
21st-century American politicians
21st-century American women politicians
African-American state legislators in New Hampshire
Daniel Webster College alumni
Living people
Democratic Party members of the New Hampshire House of Representatives
Democratic Party New Hampshire state senators
Southern New Hampshire University alumni
Women state legislators in New Hampshire